Madambakkam  is a residential locality present in Tambaram Corporation located south Chennai, India. It borders Selaiyur in the west, Sembakkam in north and Vengaivasal in north east and Sithalapakkam in east. The town is well known for its greeneries and the centuries old Dhenupureeswarar temple.

Geography
It has an average elevation of 29 metres (95 feet).

Demographics

 India census, Madambakkam had a population of 31,681, Males constitute 51% of the population and females 49%.

As per the religious census of 2011, Madambakkam had 84.72% Hindus, 2.74% Muslims, 11.79% Christians, 0.07% Sikhs, 0.02% Buddhists, 0.07% Jains and 0.5% following other religions/groups.

Temple

Madambakkam is known for its historic Temple dedicated to Lord Shiva. The main deity of the temple is Lord Dhenupureeswarar. The temple is believed to be revamped during the tenure of Kulothunga Chola. The temple itself is said to have built during the period of the Parantaka Chola II (Sundara Chola), around 956–973 CE. It has sculptures and different postures of Shiva.

There is also a universal shrine for Sri Seshadriswamigal, SriChakra mahameru Lalithatripurasundari, SriGuruvayoorappan, 18 Siddars, SriNagarajar with his consorts SriNagalakshmi & SriNagavalli, and a Ghosala for cows which allows worship, irrespective of caste, creed, or religion. 18 Siddars represent the Navagrahas (each planet is represented by 2 Siddars). Siddar Havan is the most popular way of worship, wherein the individuals are permitted to perform velvi by themselves. This is also called as Navagraha Parihara Stalam. This universal shrine for worship is built by Guruji KVLN Sharmaji principle disciple of Sathguru Sri Seshadri swamigal

The temple is one of the 163 notified areas (megalithic sites) in the state of Tamil Nadu.

The Gajaprishta Vimana temple contains inscriptions ranging from the period of Cholas through Sundara Pandya to Vijayanagara kings. The inscriptions reveal that the original name of Lord Dhenupureeswarar was Sittreri Udaiya Nayanar and that of Goddess Dhenukambal was Nampirattiyar. The passageway through which visitors pass to see the main deity belongs to the Vijayanagara period.

Tambaram Corporation 
Madambakkam is part of Tambaram Municipal Corporation issued in G.O dated 13-1-2022. Tambaram corporation will encompass two municipalities, four town panchayats in Perungalathur, Peerkankaranai, Madambakkam and Chitlapakkam, and seven village panchayats.

The Madambakkam is chiefly a residential area [which includes Military, Navy & Airforce settlements].

Schools
The neighbourhood has a panchayat union primary school and a government higher secondary school, besides many private schools such as Zion Matriculation Higher Secondary School, Kendriya Vidyalaya (two branches), Alwin Memorial Public School (Zion Group), and Sri Kanchi Mahaswami Vidya Mandir.

RTO
The Madambakkam RTO previously used TN-22-xx-XXXX (MEENAMBAKKAM - Alandur), but currently using TN-11-xx-XXXX (Tambaram).

Church
A Pentecostal Church is located on Mohan Nagar Main St, Mohan Nagar, Madambakkam, Chennai, Tamil Nadu.

Masjid

 Madeena Masjid - Maruthi Nagar, Madambakkam
 Masjid - Mohan Nagar, Madambakkam

References

Cities and towns in Chengalpattu district
Suburbs of Chennai